The UAR Socialist Youth Organization was a youth organization in Egypt. It was set up as the youth wing of the Arab Socialist Union in 1965. It came under the leadership of Marxist sectors. Mufid Shihab was the general secretary of the organization.

Gamal Abdul Nasser clamped down on the organization (as well as other leftist sectors in the Arab Socialist Union) in 1968, halting much of its activities. Many of its activists later left the organization, dissatisfied with Nasser's Arab socialism. These activists became the core of the radical student movement during the early 1970s.

References

Arab nationalism in Egypt
Arab socialist organizations
Arab Socialist Union
Socialism in Egypt
United Arab Republic
Youth organisations based in Egypt
Youth organizations established in 1965
1965 establishments in Egypt
Youth wings of political parties